Lambert Trophy may refer to:

Lambert-Meadowlands Trophy, and the Lambert Cup, annual awards given to the best team in the East in the various divisions of American college football
Jack Lambert Trophy, an annual award given by the Touchdown Club of Columbus to the top American collegiate linebacker